Dharamdev Pishorimal Anand (26 September 1923 – 3 December 2011), better known as Dev Anand, was an Indian actor, writer, director and producer known for his work in Hindi cinema, through a career that spanned over six decades. He was one of the most successful actors of Indian cinema and a part of "Trinity – The Golden Trio" along with Raj Kapoor and Dilip Kumar. The Government of India honoured him with the Padma Bhushan in 2001 and the Dadasaheb Phalke Award in 2002 for his contribution to Indian cinema. He has won the Filmfare Award for Best Actor twice and Filmfare's Lifetime Achievement Award in 1993.

A fast dialogue delivery style and nodding while doing so soon became the trademarks of Anand's acting in movies. His style was copied by other actors. Most of Dev Anand's films explored his viewpoint of the world and often highlighted many socially relevant topics.

In 1946, he debuted with lead role in Prabhat Films' Hum Ek Hain, a film about Hindu-Muslim unity. In late 40s, Anand was offered a few roles starring as the male lead opposite singer-actress Suraiya in woman-oriented films such as Vidya (1948), Jeet (1949), Afsar (1950) and Sanam (1951). In 1949, Anand launched his own company Navketan Films, under this banner, he produced and directed some of his most successful films. His breakthrough Baazi (1951), is regarded as the forerunner of the spate of "Bombay Noir" films that followed in Bollywood in the 1950s. In later years, he starred many successful films such as Jaal (1952), Pocket Maar (1956), Munimji (1955), Funtoosh (1956), Paying Guest (1957) and Kala Pani (1958). He acquired a romantic image with films such as Manzil (1960), Jab Pyar Kisi Se Hota Hai (1961), Hum Dono (1961), Tere Ghar Ke Samne (1963), His first colour film, Guide (1965) was based on the novel of the same name by R. K. Narayan was entered for Best Foreign Language Film at the 38th Academy Awards.  In 70s, he debuted in direction with the espionage drama Prem Pujari. Throughout the 70s and 80s, he starred in many box office hits such as Johny Mera Naam (1970), which was highest grosser of the year and Hare Rama Hare Krishna (1971), Banarasi Babu (1973), Heera Panna (1973), Warrant (1975 Des Pardes (1978), Lootmaar (1980) and Swami Dada (1982), Hum Naujawan (1985) and Lashkar (1989).

Early life
Anand was born Dharamdev Pishorimal Anand on 26 September 1923Dev Anand (2007) Romancing With Life, An Autobiography. Penguin/Viking. p. 1 . in the Shakargarh tehsil of the Gurdaspur district in Punjab (British India).  His father Pishori Lal Anand was a well-to-do advocate in Gurdaspur District Court. Dev was the third of four sons born to Anand. One of Dev's younger sisters is Sheel Kanta Kapur, who is the mother of film director Shekhar Kapur. His older brothers were Manmohan Anand (Advocate, Gurdaspur Dist. Court) and Chetan Anand and the younger one was Vijay Anand. He did his schooling till matriculation from Sacred Heart School, Dalhousie, (then in Punjab) and went to Government college Dharamshala before going to Lahore to study. Later Dev completed a B.A. degree in English Literature from the Government College, Lahore in British India.

Part of the Anand family, he co-founded Navketan Films in 1949 with his elder brother Chetan Anand.

Career

After completing his BA degree in English literature from the Government College, Lahore (then in British India). Anand left his home-town for Bombay in the early 1940s. He began his career in the military censor's office at Churchgate, for a monthly salary of Rs. 65. Later, he worked as a clerk in an accounting firm for a salary of Rs. 85. He joined his older brother, Chetan, as a member of the Indian People's Theatre Association (IPTA). Anand aspired to become a performer after seeing Ashok Kumar's performance in films such as Achhut Kanya and Kismet. Anand quoted in an interview that "I remember when I gate-crashed into the office of the man who gave me the first break, he kept looking at me – Babu Rao Pai of Prabhat Film Studios. At that time he made up his mind that this boy deserves a break and later mentioned to his people that 'this boy struck me because of his smile and beautiful eyes and his tremendous confidence.'" Then he was soon offered the lead role in Prabhat Films' Hum Ek Hain (1946), a film about Hindu-Muslim unity, where Dev Anand played a Hindu boy and was paired opposite Kamala Kotnis. While shooting the film in Pune, Anand befriended the actor Guru Dutt. Between them, they agreed that if one of them were to become successful in the film industry, he would help the other also to be successful. They formed a mutual understanding that when Anand produced a film, Dutt would direct it and when Dutt directed a film, Anand would act in it.

Late 1940s and romance with Suraiya
In the late 1940s, Anand was offered a few roles starring as the male lead opposite singer-actress Suraiya in woman-oriented films.  While shooting these films, they became romantically involved. The two of them were paired in seven films together: Vidya (1948), Jeet (1949), Shair (1949), Afsar (1950), Nili (1950), Do Sitare (1951) and Sanam (1951), all of which were successful at the box office. In these films, Suraiya was always first-biller in the credits, indicating that she was a bigger star than Anand. She fell in love with him during the shooting of the song Kinare Kinare Chale Jayen Ge from the film Vidya— while shooting the scene, the boat they were in capsized, and Anand saved Suraiya from drowning. Initially, Suraiya's family used to welcome Anand at home, but when her maternal grandmother found out that the two were in love, and even planned an actual marriage on the set of Jeet, she started monitoring them. The two shared love letters and messages through their co-actors, like Durga Khote and Kamini Kaushal, who went out of their way to engineer secret rendezvous. During the shooting of the film Afsar (1950), Anand finally proposed to Suraiya and gave her a diamond ring worth Rs 3,000. Her maternal grandmother opposed the relationship as they were Muslim and Anand was Hindu, and so, Suraiya remained unmarried. They stopped acting together after her grandmother opposed their partnership, and Do Sitare was the last film in which they appeared together. Although the films he starred in with Suraiya had been successful, the producers and directors of those films attributed their success to the acting prowess and screen presence of Suraiya. Anand began looking for an opportunity to play the main male lead in a film where his acting skills could be demonstrated, so as to dispel scepticism about his acting abilities.

Dev Anand often spoke about Suraiya and his love affair with her, in various interviews he gave to film magazines, such as Stardust (June 1972 issue), Star & Style (Feb 1987 issue) and TV to Karan Thapar for BBC (2002), while both were alive, and after Suraiya's death in interviews given on TV to Simi Garewal (Rendezvouz with Simi Garewal) and others on TV and for news magazines.

Break and the 1950s
Anand was offered his first big break by Ashok Kumar. He spotted Anand hanging around in the studios and picked him as the hero for the Bombay Talkies production Ziddi (1948), co-starring Kamini Kaushal, which became an instant success. After Ziddis success, Anand decided that he would start producing films. It was in the film Ziddi, where the first ever Kishore-Lata duet, "Yeh Kaun Aaya Karke Yeh Sola Singhar",  was recorded. This duet was an instant hit, and from here on both playback singers' associations with Dev Anand began. This continued for the next four decades. His association with Kishore Kumar started when the former sang the first solo of his playback singing career – "Marne Ki Duayen" – picturised on Dev Anand in the movie Ziddi. Dev had forged a very strong bond of friendship with Kishore Kumar during the making of the film. In 1949, he launched his own company Navketan Films (named after his elder brother Chetan's son Ketan and which means "New Banner"), which, as of 2011, has produced 35 films. Nirala (1950), a commercial success, saw him being paired opposite Madhubala for the first time, with whom he would later form a popular pair.

Dev chose Guru Dutt as director for the crime thriller, Baazi (1951). The film, starring Dev Anand, Geeta Bali and Kalpana Kartik was a trendsetter, regarded as the forerunner of the spate of urban crime films that followed in Bollywood in the 1950s. The film Baazi saw the debut of Kalpana Kartik (aka Mona Singha) as the lead female actress and Guru Dutt as a director. The collaboration was a success at the box office and the duo of Dev Anand and Kalpana Kartik were offered many films to star in together. They signed all the film offers and subsequently the movies Aandhiyan (1952), Taxi Driver (1954), House No. 44 (1955) and Nau Do Gyarah (1957) went on to become big hits too. During the making of the film Taxi Driver, the couple fell in love and Dev proposed marriage to his heroine Kalpana. In 1954, Taxi Driver was declared a hit and the two decided to marry in a quiet ceremony. The couple had a son, Suneil Anand in 1956 and later a daughter, Devina, was born. After her marriage, Kalpana decided not to pursue her acting career further. Nau Do Gyarah was the couple's last movie together.

A rapid-fire style of dialogue delivery and a penchant for nodding while speaking became Dev's style in films such as Baazi (1951), Jaal (1952), House No. 44 (1955), Pocket Maar (1956), Munimji (1955), Funtoosh (1956), C.I.D. (1956) and Paying Guest (1957).  In the 1950s his films were of the mystery genre or light comedy love stories or were films with social relevance such as Ek Ke Baad Ek (1959) and Funtoosh (1956). His style was lapped up by the audience and was widely imitated. He starred in a string of box office successes for the remainder of the 1950s opposite newcomer Waheeda Rehman in C.I.D. (1956), Solva Saal (1958), Kala Bazar (1960) and Baat Ek Raat Ki (1962). Waheeda first became a star when C.I.D became a hit. The pair acted in Roop Ki Rani Choron Ka Raja (1961 film) and Prem Pujari later. In 1955, he also co-starred with Dilip Kumar in Insaniyat.  With his acting in the box office success Kala Pani (1958) opposite Madhubala and Nalini Jaywant, as the son who is willing to go to any lengths to clear his framed father's name, he won his first Filmfare award for Best Actor for the film. He attempted films of tragic genre occasionally, such as Pocket Maar (1956), Kala Pani (1958), Bombai Ka Baboo (1960) and Sharabi (1964) and tasted success with them. Dev also played a few characters with a negative shade, as in Jaal (1952) where he played a smuggler, then as an absconding gang member in Dushman (1957), and as a black marketer in Kala Bazar. Apart from his pairing with Suraiya and Kalpana Kartik, his pairing with Nutan and Waheeda Rehman was popular among the audiences in the late 50s and 60s. His films Rahi (1952) and Aandhiyan (1952), were screened along with Raj Kapoor's Awaara. From the early fifties till mid sixties, the trio of actors Dilip Kumar, Raj Kapoor and Anand ruled the roost.

Romantic hero image in the 1960s
In the sixties, Dev Anand acquired a romantic image with films such as Manzil and Tere Ghar Ke Samne with Nutan, Kinare Kinare with Meena Kumari, Maya with Mala Sinha, Asli-Naqli with Sadhana Shivdasani, Jab Pyar Kisi Se Hota Hai, Mahal with Asha Parekh and Teen Deviyaan opposite three heroines Kalpana, Simi Garewal and Nanda. In the film Teen Deviyaan, Dev Anand played a playboy. One of his notable films of the early sixties was Hum Dono (1961) which he produced and acted in, as Anand, a young lover who joins the army in frustration over being shunned by the father of his love Meeta (played by Sadhana Shivdasani). Anand played a double role in the film, also acting as Major Varma, his look-alike who he runs into in the army and forms a deep friendship with. Notable for its music by Jaidev, the film was a box office hit.

His first colour film, Guide with Waheeda Rehman was based on the novel of the same name by R. K. Narayan. Dev Anand himself was the impetus for making the film version of the book. He met and persuaded Narayan to give his assent to the project. Dev Anand tapped his friends in Hollywood to launch an Indo-US co-production that was shot in Hindi and English simultaneously and was released in 1965. Guide, directed by younger brother Vijay Anand, was an acclaimed movie. Dev played Raju, a voluble guide, who supports Rosy (Waheeda) in her bid for freedom.  He is not above thoughtlessly exploiting her for personal gains. Combining style with substance, he gave an affecting performance as a man grappling with his emotions in his passage through love, shame and salvation.

He reunited with Vijay Anand for the movie Jewel Thief, based on the thriller genre which featured Vyjayanthimala, Tanuja, Anju Mahendru, Faryal and Helen and was very successful. Their next collaboration, Johny Mera Naam (1970), again a thriller, in which Dev was paired opposite Hema Malini was a big hit. It was Johnny Mera Naam which made Hema Malini a big star.

In 1969, he was a member of the jury at the 6th Moscow International Film Festival.

Directorial debut and the Versatile Hero Image in 1970s
His directorial debut, the espionage drama Prem Pujari, was a flop but has developed a cult following over the years. The film introduced Zaheeda and had Waheeda Rehman as thefemale lead. He tasted success with his 1971 directorial effort, Hare Rama Hare Krishna, shot primarily in Nepal around Swyambhunath, and Bhaktapur, in which talks about the prevalent hippie culture. His find Zeenat Aman, who played the mini-skirt sporting, pot-smoking Janice, became an overnight sensation. Dev also became known as a filmmaker of trenchantly topical themes. The same year, he starred with Mumtaz in Tere Mere Sapne, an adaptation of A. J. Cronin's novel, The Citadel. The film was directed by Dev's brother, Vijay and was also successful. In 1971 he paired again with Zaheeda in Gambler which went on to become a success.

In the 1970s, Raj Kapoor started playing roles of fathers in films such as Kal Aaj Aur Kal in 1971 and Dharam Karam in 1974 and had put on a lot of weight and films with Dilip Kumar as lead hero like Dastaan and Bairaag were failures at the box office. Some of the hurriedly made films with Dev Anand as the leading man—three each opposite Hema Malini – Shareef Badmaash, Jaaneman, Joshila and two with Zeenat Aman – Ishq Ishq Ishq, Prem Shastra and Saheb Bahadur with Priya Rajvansh — became flops and posed a threat to his career as leading man. He bounced back with the double role film Banarasi Babu in 1973. He delivered commercial hits again with young heroines like with Sharmila Tagore in Yeh Gulistan Hamara (1972), with Yogeeta Bali and Raakhee in Banarasi Babu (1973), with Hema Malini in Chhupa Rustam (1973) and Amir Garib (1974), with Zeenat Aman in Heera Panna (1973), Warrant (1975), Kalabaaz and Darling Darling (1977) and with Parveen Babi in Bullet (1976). The presence of his discoveries in the 1970s—Zeenat, and later Tina Munim, in films and his good on-screen chemistry with beautiful young stars such as Raakhee, Parveen Babi, Hema Malini and Zeenat Aman in various films boosted Dev's image as the evergreen star even though he was well into his fifties. He attempted different genres of films so acquired versatile hero image.  He was already 55 when he was paired with Tina Munim in 1978 in Des Pardes, which became among the top five grossing films of the year.

Political activism during the Emergency in the late 1970s
Dev Anand has also been politically active. He led a group of film personalities who stood up against the Internal Emergency imposed by the then Prime Minister of India, Indira Gandhi. He actively campaigned against her with his supporters in Indian parliamentary elections in 1977. He also formed a party called the "National Party of India", which he later disbanded.

Later career and Evergreen Hero Image
The 1978 hit Des Pardes, directed by Dev Anand was the debut movie of actress Tina Munim and this film's success gave him the tag of the Evergreen Hero. Dev Anand was offered the lead role in Man Pasand by director Basu Chatterjee. Dev Anand's successful run at the box office continued in the 1980s with Man Pasand, Lootmaar (both opposite Tina Munim) and Swami Dada (1982), all being critically acclaimed and box office hits.

Though Dev Anand's demand as the lead hero had not decreased even in the 1980s, he decided that it was the right time to introduce his son Suneil Anand in films as the hero. He launched his son in the Kramer vs. Kramer-inspired Anand Aur Anand (1984), which was produced and directed by Dev Anand himself and had music by R.D. Burman. He expected the film to do well, but the film was a box office disaster and Suneil Anand decided not to act in films any more.

But films with Dev Anand as the lead hero in Hum Naujawan (1985) and Lashkar (1989) continued to be box office successes and were appreciated by critics. Awwal Number (1990), where Dev Anand co-starred with Aditya Pancholi and Aamir Khan became an average grosser in the year 1990. Aamir said in an interview that Awwal Number is the only film he signed without reading the script because it was being directed by his senior Dev Anand. Aamir quoted: "Dev saab was an icon for many generations and entertained us throughout his life".  He was already 60 years old in 1983 when he acted opposite Christine O'Neil and alongside Rati Agnihotri and Padmini Kolhapure in Swami Dada. In 1989, his directorial venture Sachche ka Bolbala was released. Though critically acclaimed, it was a commercial failure. His performance as Professor Anand in the 1989 film Lashkar was widely appreciated and was a major success at the box office. Lashkar was his last hit film in the lead role in 1989, with him neither being producer nor director of the film.

He directed Pyar Ka Tarana in 1993, without casting himself in any role. His directorial movie Gangster (1995) had a controversial nude rape scene of an unknown actress, though the movie was released uncut. He received offers to star in lead role in outside of his home banners in films like Return of Jewel Thief and Aman Ke Farishtey but the former was not successful at the box office and the latter wasn't released in 1993 though the film was fully ready to be released.

Since 1992, seven of his directorial ventures were box office failures. His films Sau Crore (1991) and Censor (2000) were critically acclaimed.

His performance and direction in the 1991 film Sau Crore was appreciated as it was a movie ahead of its time dealing with real life murder of badminton star Syed Modi and the arrest being made of the wife and her ex-lover. Sau Crore remains the last commercial hit film of Dev Anand as the lead hero as well as a director. His last film Chargesheet (2011) was panned by critics across the board.

He also starred in English films such as The Evil Within (1970), where he was paired opposite Vietnamese actress Kieu Chinh and Zeenat Aman and Guide (English Version). The English language film The Evil Within was a 20th-Century Fox production which couldn't get the nod from the concerned authorities due to its parallel track dealing with opium selling and thus the Indian viewers were deprived of this American venture. Of the 114 Hindi films, he appeared in, over 6 decades, Kahin Aur Chal (1968) had a delayed release in the early 1970s and the multi-starrer film Ek Do Teen Chaar (1980) remained unreleased and Shrimanji (1968) had him in a guest appearance.  By 2011, he had the second most solo lead roles in Hindi films— 92,  with Rajesh Khanna having the record for the most films as solo lead hero in Hindi films – 106.

 Recognition 

Comparisons with Gregory Peck
Often compared to the famous actor Gregory Peck the world over, Dev Anand said that he didn't feel ecstatic hearing the tag line bestowed on him in his heyday. "When you are at an impressionable age you make idols, but when you grow out of the phase, you develop your own persona. I don't want to be known as India's Gregory Peck, I am Dev Anand".

Times of India. Retrieved on 9 November 2018.

Dev Anand and Suraiya met Peck for the first time at Bombay's Willingdon Club, after the Filmfare Awards in 1954, on Peck's stopover from a schedule at Sri Lanka after shooting for The Purple Plain. He knew of the "Indian Star" as an actor, more so probably because his romance with Suraiya was grabbing the headlines, and they had a chat. The second time they met was in Rome when Dev Anand was on his way back from the Venice Film Festival, he visited him on the set of Roman Holiday. "I was returning from the Venice film fest. I stopped my car and joined the crowd watching the shoot, hoping that his eyes would fall on me. As expected, he nodded and I walked up to him. He remembered me and we exchanged pleasantries." The third meeting was at London on the set of Moby Dick. However, Suraiya asked for an exclusive meeting with her idol at her house. Though Anand says jealousy was natural for anyone in love, he didn't mind that he was not invited. "I didn't quite feel anything. It wasn't as if they were going to fall in love or make love. Even if they would have, it wouldn't have mattered. I was mature enough. Moreover, he wasn't my rival. I too was a big star by then," says Anand.

Critical appraisal
Dev Anand has directed 19 films and produced 35 films. Off the 35 films he produced, 18 were commercially successful at the box office and off the 19 films directed by him 10 were hits. He wrote the stories for 13 of his films. Critics say his directorial ventures have always been ahead of their time. Dev Anand's films are well known for their hit songs. He is known to have been an active participant in the music sessions of a number of his films. His association with music composers Shankar-Jaikishen, O. P. Nayyar, Kalyanji-Anandji, Sachin Dev Burman and his son Rahul Dev Burman, lyricists Hasrat Jaipuri, Majrooh Sultanpuri, Gopaldas Neeraj, Shailendra, Anand Bakshi, and playback singers Kishore Kumar, Mohammed Rafi and Hemant Kumar produced some very popular songs. Guru Dutt, Kishore Kumar, Mohammed Rafi, Pran, Dilip Kumar, Raj Kapoor, Sunil Dutt, Nargis, Vyjayanthimala, S.D. Burman, Shammi Kapoor and R.D. Burman were his closest friends from the film industry.

In September 2007, Dev's autobiography Romancing with Life was released at a birthday party with the Indian Prime Minister Dr. Manmohan Singh.
In February 2011, his 1961 black-and-white film Hum Dono was digitised, colourised and re-released.

Dev Anand is credited with giving actors such as Zarina Wahab in Ishq Ishq Ishq, Jackie Shroff in Swami Dada (1982), Tabu in Hum Naujawan and Richa Sharma (Sanjay Dutt's first wife) a break in the film industry, discovering Zeenat Amaan, Tina Munim and encouraging music composer Rajesh Roshan. Amit Khanna started his career with Navketan as executive producer in 1971 and had been secretary to Dev Anand in the 1970s. He adds, "The uniqueness of Navketan today is that it's the only film company in the world still run by the one who started it." Shatrughan Sinha disclosed in an interview that it was Dev Anand who gave him a break in films by giving him a role in Prem Pujari and since Dev had given Sinha a very small role in that film, he compensated for it by giving Sinha another role in his next film Gambler. Sinha quoted: "Later on we worked together in Sharif Badmash and it was really a privilege to work with him". It was under Dev Anand's Navketan Banner where Guru Dutt, Raj Khosla, Waheeda Rehman, S.D. Burman, Jaidev, Sahir Ludhianvi, Majrooh Sultanpuri, Yash Johar, Shekhar Kapur and Kabir Bedi were given breaks into Hindi films and Dev launched actors Zaheera, Zaheeda Hussain, Zarina Wahab, Natasha Sinha, Ekta Sohini and Sabrina.

 Personal life 
Anand had a love affair with actress Suraiya from 1948 to 1951, but they never married, because of opposition by Suraiya's maternal grandmother. Suraiya remained unmarried throughout her life till she died on 31 January 2004.Why did Suraiya break Dev Anand's heart? . MagnaMags (20 March 2014). Retrieved on 9 November 2018. In 1954, Dev married Kalpana Kartik (actual name Mona Singha), a Bollywood actress from Shimla, in a private marriage during the shooting of the film Taxi Driver. They have two children, son Suneil and daughter Devina.

Death
Dev Anand died in his room at The Washington Mayfair Hotel in London at the age of 88 on 3 December 2011 of a cardiac arrest. His death came just two months after the release of his last film Chargesheet, which he directed and produced. Anand was reportedly in London for a medical checkup at the time of his death. On 10 December, his funeral service was held at a small chapel in London after which his coffin was taken to the Putney Vale Crematorium in southwest London. His ashes were returned to India for immersion burial in the Godavari River.

 Awards and honours 

The Government of India honoured him with the Padma Bhushan in 2001 and the Dadasaheb Phalke Award in 2002 for his contribution to Indian cinema. His career spanned more than 65 years, acting in 114 Hindi films, of which 92 had him play the main solo lead hero, and he did two English films. He was the recipient of the Filmfare Award for Best Actor for his performances in Kala Pani and Guide, the latter being India's official entry to the Oscars.

Civilian award
 2001 – Padma Bhushan (India's third highest civilian award from the Government of India)

National Film Awards
Winner
 1965 – National Film Award for Best Feature Film in Hindi for Guide 2002 – Dadasaheb Phalke Award, India's highest award for cinematic excellence

Filmfare awards
Winner
 1959 – Best Actor for Kala Pani 1967 – Best Actor for Guide 1967 – Best Film for Guide 1993 – Lifetime Achievement Award

National honours 
 1995 – Screen Lifetime Achievement Award
 1997 – Mumbai Academy of Moving Images Award for his Outstanding Services to the Indian Film Industry
 1998 – Lifetime Achievement Award by the Ujala Anandlok Film Awards Committee in Calcutta
 1999 – Sansui Lifetime Achievement Award for his "Immense Contribution to Indian Cinema" in New Delhi
 2000 – Film Goers' Mega Movie Maestro of the Millennium Award in Mumbai
 2001 – Special Screen Award for his contribution to Indian cinema
 2001 – Evergreen Star of the Millennium Award at the Zee Gold Bollywood Awards on 28 April 2001 at the Nassau Coliseum, New York
 2003 – Lifetime Achievement Award for "Outstanding Achievement in Indian Cinema" at IIFA Award in Johannesburg, South Africa
 2004 – Legend of Indian Cinema Award at Atlantic City (United States)
 2004 – Living Legend Award by the Federation of Indian Chamber of Commerce and Industry (FICCI) in recognition of his contribution to the Indian entertainment industry
 2005 – Sony Gold Award
 2006 – ANR National Award by the Akkineni International Foundation
 2006 – Glory of India Award by IIAF, London
 2007 – Punjab Ratan (Jewel of Punjab) Award by the World Punjabi Organisation (European Division) for his outstanding contribution in the field of art and entertainment.
 2008 – Lifetime Achievement Award by Ramya Cultural Academy in association with Vinmusiclub
 2008 – Lifetime Achievement Award by Rotary Club of Bombay
 2008 – Awarded at the IIJS Solitaire Awards
 2009 – Outstanding contribution to Indian cinema at the Max Stardust Awards
 2009 –  Legend Award given to Dev Anand by Rajinikanth
 2010 – Phalke Ratna Award by Dadasaheb Phalke Academy
 2010 – Rashtriya Gaurav Award
 2011 – Rashtriya Kishore Kumar Samman from the Government of Madhya Pradesh
 2011 – NDTV Indian of the Year's Lifetime Achievement Award with Rahul Dravid
 Lifetime Achievement Maestro Award by the Whistling Woods International Institute.
 2013 – To honour him, a brass statue in his likeness was unveiled at Walk of the Stars at Bandra Bandstand in Mumbai in February 2013.
 2013 – On the occasion of 100 years of the Indian cinema, a postage stamp bearing his likeness was released by India Post to honour him on 3 May 2013.

International honours

 In July 2000, in New York City, he was honoured by an Award from the hands of the then First Lady of the United States of America, Hillary Clinton, for his "Outstanding Contribution to Indian Cinema".
 In 2000, he was awarded the Indo-American Association "Star of the Millennium" Award in Silicon Valley, California.
 Donna Ferrar, Member of the New York State Assembly, honoured him with a "New York State Assembly Citation" for his "Outstanding Contribution to the Cinematic Arts Worthy of the Esteem and Gratitude of the Great State of New York" on 1 May 2001.
 In 2005, he was honoured with a "Special National Film Award" by the Government of Nepal at Nepal's first National Indian film festival in Stockholm.
 In 2008, he was guest of honour at a dinner hosted by the Provost of Highland Council in Inverness, Scotland to celebrate 10 years since he first worked in the Scottish Highlands. He spent several days in the area, en route to Cannes, as a guest of the Highlands and Islands Film Commission.

Filmography

Some of his best considered films are Baazi (1951), Jaal (1952), Taxi Driver (1954), C.I.D. (1956), Kala Pani (1958), Kala Bazar (1960), Jab Pyar Kisi Se Hota Hai (1961), Hum Dono (1961),  Guide (1965), Jewel Thief (1967) Johny Mera Naam (1970), Haré Rama Haré Krishna (1971), Banarasi Babu (1974) Warrant (1975), Des Pardes (1978) and Swami Dada (1982), Lashkar (1987).

Further reading
 Cinema Modern: Navketan Story, by Sidharth Bhatia. Harpercollins, 2011. .
 Evergreen Dev Anand (An Anthology of Dev Anand's Contribution to Cinema)'', by Kamal Dhiman. Nikita Publications, 2014. .

References

External links

 
 RIP Dev Anand – Bollywood Mourns Dev Anand's Death
 The Telegraph – Dev Anand Bio and Obituary

Indian male film actors
1923 births
2011 deaths
Filmfare Lifetime Achievement Award winners
Dadasaheb Phalke Award recipients
Recipients of the Padma Bhushan in arts
Hindi-language film directors
Hindi film producers
Male actors in Hindi cinema
Film directors from Mumbai
Film producers from Mumbai
Male actors from Mumbai
Government College University, Lahore alumni
People from Gurdaspur
Punjabi people
20th-century Indian male actors
20th-century Indian film directors
21st-century Indian film directors
Filmfare Awards winners
People from Narowal District
People from Lahore